Army Group South was the name of three German Army Groups during World War II.

It was first used in the 1939 September Campaign, along with Army Group North to invade Poland. In the Invasion of Poland Army Group South was led by Gerd von Rundstedt and his chief of staff Erich von Manstein.

Two years later, Army Group South became one of three army groups into which Germany organised their forces for Operation Barbarossa. Army Group South's principal objective was to capture Soviet Ukraine and its capital Kiev.

In September 1944, the Army Group South Ukraine was renamed Army Group South in Eastern Hungary. It fought in Western Hungary until March 1945 and retired to Austria at the end of the Second World War, where it was renamed Army Group Ostmark on 2 April 1945.

Operation Barbarossa

Ukraine was a major center of Soviet industry and mining and had the good farmland required for Hitler's plans for Lebensraum ('living space'). Army Group South was to advance up to the Volga River, engaging a part of the Red Army and thus clearing the way for the Army Group North and the Army Group Center on their approach to Leningrad and Moscow respectively.

To carry out these initial tasks its battle order included the First Panzer Group (Gen. Kleist) and the German Sixth (Gen. Reichenau), Seventeenth (Gen. Stülpnagel) and Eleventh Armies (Gen. Schobert), Luftlotte 1 (Keller) and the Romanian Third and Fourth Armies.

Operation Blue
In preparation for Operation Blue, the 1942 campaign in southern Russia and the Caucasus, Army Group South was split into two army groups:  Army Group A and Army Group B. Army Group A was ordered south to capture the oil fields in the Caucasus.

In February 1943, Army Group Don and the existing Army Group B were combined and re-designated Army Group South. A new Army Group B became a major formation elsewhere. The German Sixth Army, which was destroyed in the Battle of Stalingrad, was re-constituted and later made part of Army Group South in March 1943. On 4 April 1944, Army Group South was re-designated Army Group North Ukraine. Army Group North Ukraine existed from 4 April to 28 September.

In September 1944, Army Group South Ukraine was re-designated Army Group South. At the end of World War II in Europe, Army Group South was again renamed; as Army Group Ostmark, the remnants of Army Group South ended the war fighting in and around Austria and Protectorate of Bohemia and Moravia. Army Group Ostmark was one of the last major German military formations to surrender to the Allies.

Order of battle for Army Group South, October 1944

Commanders

See also
 Army Group Centre
 Army Group North

References

1939 establishments in Germany
South
Military units and formations established in 1939